Ikram Rabbani is a former Pakistani cricket umpire. He stood in one Test match, Pakistan vs. Sri Lanka, in 1991 and six ODI games between 1984 and 1995.

See also
 List of Test cricket umpires
 List of One Day International cricket umpires

References

Year of birth missing (living people)
Living people
Place of birth missing (living people)
Pakistani Test cricket umpires
Pakistani One Day International cricket umpires